Carsten Leth Schmidt (born 3 December 1968 in Haderslev) is a Danish politician. He has been the leader of Schleswig Party since 2012, and has been a part of the municipal council in Haderslev Municipality since 2017. He is a farmer, and lives in the village of Sønderballe in Haderslev Municipality.

Political career
Schmidt first ran in local elections in the 2005 Danish local elections, but was first elected in the 2017 elections where he entered the municipal council of Haderslev Municipality.

References 

1968 births
Living people
People from Haderslev Municipality
Schleswig Party politicians
Leaders of Schleswig Party
Danish municipal councillors